Poland competed at the 1938 European Athletics Championships in Paris, France, from 3-5 September 1938. A delegation of 15 athletes were sent to represent the country.

Medals

References

European Athletics Championships
1938
Nations at the 1938 European Athletics Championships